Cyclin-dependent kinase 2-associated protein 1 is an enzyme that in humans is encoded by the CDK2AP1 gene.

Function 

The protein encoded by this gene is a specific CDK2-associated protein, which is thought to negatively regulate CDK2 activity by sequestering monomeric CDK2, and targeting CDK2 for proteolysis. This protein was found to also interact with DNA polymerase alpha/primase and mediate the phosphorylation of the large p180 subunit, which suggested the regulatory role in DNA replication during S phase of the cell cycle. A similar gene in hamster was isolated from, and functions as a growth suppressor of normal keratinocytes.

Interactions 

CDK2AP1 has been shown to interact with Cyclin-dependent kinase 2.

It interacts with unnamed protein product (BC006130) which may mediate inhibitory effect of CDK2AP1 on cell proliferation.

References

External links

Further reading